Thangamalai Ragasiyam is a 1957 Indian Tamil-language adventure film produced and directed by B. R. Panthulu. The film stars Sivaji Ganesan, T. R. Rajakumari and Jamuna. It was simultaneously made in Kannada as Rathnagiri Rahasya. The film was released on 29 June 1957 and emerged a success.

Plot 

Gajendran, a prince, is separated from his parents by his father's foe at a very young age. He grew up as a ferocious and vicious caveman. Then he meets Amutha, who by her word of love and affection turns Gajendran for good. Both set out to find the secret of Thangamalai to find and save Gajendran's parents.

Cast 
Cast according to the song book and the opening credits of the film:

Male cast
 Sivaji Ganesan as Gajendran
 M. N. Nambiar as Adithan
 P. S. Veerappa as Mahendran
 T. R. Ramachandran as Azhagesan
 K. Sarangapani as Sarangan
 C. V. V. Panthulu as Nandini's Father
 Kottapuli Jayaraman as Sundaran
 Ganapathi Bhat as Andaran
 M. S. Karuppaiah as Barber
 (Late) V. P. Balaram as Coach
 Velappa as Minister
 Kannan.S.A as Saint
 Thiruvenkatam as Commander
 Mani Bhagavathar Iyer as Mridanga Maestro
 Devadas as Thief

Female cast
 T. R. Rajakumari as Nandini
 Jamuna as Amutha
 M. V. Rajamma as Kumutha
 P. Dhanam as Sundari
 P. Susheela as Beautiful Mohini
 B. Saroja Devi as Young Mohini
 Angamuthu as Barber's Wife
 Shanthi as Friend
 (Baby) Seetha as Young Vikraman
 Indira Acharya as Kurathi

Supporting cast
 Chowdry, Maheswara Iyer, Ramasami Iyer, Saroja, Kamala.

Uncredited role
 C. L. Anandan as a dancer in the song "Veeradhi Veeran Sooraadhi Sooran"

Production 
Thangamalai Ragasiyam was produced by B. R. Panthulu under Padmini Pictures. The original director was P. Neelakantan who left after directing a large portion of the film, resulting in Panthulu taking over direction. It was simultaneously made in Kannada as Rathnagiri Rahasya. The film was primarily shot in black-and-white, except for some sequences in Gevacolor. G. K. Ramu shot in black-and-white, and W. R. Subba Rao shot the colour sequences.

Soundtrack 
The music was composed by T. G. Lingappa. Lyrics were by Ku. Ma. Balasubramaniam and Ku. Sa. Krishnamoorthy. The song "Amudhai Pozhiyum Nilave" was later used in the Malayalam film Mariakutty (1958) as "Karalil Kaniyum Rasamey".

Release and reception 
Thangamalai Ragasiyam was released on 29 June 1957, and distributed by Meena Movies in Madras. The film was a commercial success.

References

External links 
 

1950s Tamil-language films
1957 adventure films
1957 films
Films about cavemen
Films about elephants
Films about princes
Films directed by B. R. Panthulu
Films scored by T. G. Lingappa
Films set in ancient India
Films set in forests
Indian adventure films
Indian black-and-white films